Seerat-i-Sayyid Ahmad Shaheed is the first historical biography of Syed Ahmad Barelvi, originally written in Urdu by Abul Hasan Ali Hasani Nadwi. He wrote the book at the age of 24. The book had two volumes. The first volume had 125 chapters and 588 pages. The second volume had 150 chapters and 588 pages. It contains a detailed account of the life and mission of Syed Ahmad Shahid. The book was written in 1939.

Description 
Nadwi's first literary endeavor and debut as a historian was his historical biography entitled, Seerat-i-Sayyid Ahmad Shaheed written in 1938-39 C.E. Earlier he had also published an article on Ahmad Shaheed in Arabic Journal Al-Manar during 1931 C.E. The book is a memoir of life, works and achievements of the founder of the greatest revivalist movement known to Indian history. It is the comprehensive, well-researched and documenting the vast material existing on the subject. The author claims, 

Therefore, utilizing all existing sources on the subject to produce a worthy work to understand the real worth and value of Sayyid Ahmad Shaheed’s movement and the place he occupied among the luminaries of Islam. The book made an instant success and received wide acclaim, both within and abroad. The way this book was received was an indication of the popularity of Sayyid Ahmad Shaheed and the urge of the people to know more about him. Political situation prevailing in India then had created an upsurge in the Muslims, who were eager to reclaim their identity and to see Islam strong and powerful in the world. Naturally, the Sayyid Ahmad’s message of hope and faith, of self-confidence and self-realization, contained in the book, was enthusiastically welcomed by them. Nadwi’s book and other related writing on Sayyid Ahmad Shaheed, in addition, proved to be a refutation and cleared many misconceptions about Sayyid Ahmad and his movement disseminated by some western writers, such as Peter Hardy, The Muslims of British India. William Wilson Hunter, Indian Musalmans and some apologetic writers. As Nadwi claims: 

But according to Nadwi, it seems that the chroniclers never wanted to ascertain true facts; they gave credence to every groundless rumour without evaluating the relative evidential value of the report reaching them. Therefore, on their part it was sheer shadow of narrow-spiritual charitableness bequeathed by the crusades, which was not expected of the present age persons professing to be rationalists.

References

External links 
Full Urdu Version

1939 non-fiction books
Indian books
History of Islam
Books by Abul Hasan Ali Hasani Nadwi
Deobandi literature
1939 books
Islam and politics
Works about Syed Ahmad Barelvi